Trigonopterus cahyoi is a species of flightless weevil in the genus Trigonopterus from Indonesia.

Etymology
The specific name was chosen in honor of Cahyo Rahmadi, an arachonologist who collected the first specimens of T. cayhoi.

Description
Individuals measure 2.05–3.19 mm in length.  Females are slightly slenderer than males.  General coloration is black with a rust-colored head and legs.

Range

Phylogeny
T. cahyoi is part of the T. dimorphus species group.

References

cahyoi
Beetles described in 2014
Beetles of Asia